Hallstein Rasmussen (22 April 1925 – 28 February 2016) was a Norwegian civil servant.

Rasmussen was born in Fræna, and graduated from the University of Oslo in 1952. He was first hired at the Norwegian Directorate of Fisheries in 1953, where he worked as secretary for the director Klaus Sunnanå. From 1958 to 1968 he served as secretary general for the trade union . From 1968 he was assigned assisting director in the Norwegian Directorate of Fisheries, and was appointed head of the Norwegian Directorate of Fisheries from 1978 to 1988. He was decorated Knight, First Class of the Order of St. Olav in 1995

References

External links
Hallstein Rasmussen at the Norwegian Centre for Research Data 

1925 births
2016 deaths
People from Fræna
University of Oslo alumni
Norwegian trade unionists
Directors of government agencies of Norway